Eucalyptus lockyeri, commonly known as Lockyer's box, is a species of small tree endemic to a small area in Queensland. It has rough bark near the base of the trunk, smooth bark above, lance-shaped adult leaves, flower buds in groups of seven, white flowers and hemispherical fruit.

Description 
It has rough, fibrous to flaky bark on the base of the trunk, smooth grey to brownish bark above.

Taxonomy and naming
Eucalyptus lockyeri was first formally described in 1991 by Donald Blaxell and Ken Hill from a specimen collected by Blaxell near Ravenshoe in 1978, and the description was published in the journal Telopea. The specific epithet (lockyeri) "honours Michael Lockyer of Ravenshoe, who first drew the authors' attention to this taxon".

In 1994, Ian Brooker and David Kleinig described two subspecies and the names have been accepted by the Australian Plant Census: 
 Eucalyptus lockyeri subsp. exuta Brooker & Kleinig has leaves, buds and fruit that are not glaucous;
 Eucalyptus lockyeri subsp. lockyeriBlaxell & K.D.Hillsubsp. lockyeri has glaucous leaves, buds and fruit.

Distribution and habitat 
Eucalyptus lockyeri is endemic to a restricted area of Queensland, occurring between Ravenshoe and near Herberton. It usually grows on slopes and ridges in poor, rocky soil.

Conservation status
Both subspecies of E. lockyeri are classified as "least concern" under the Queensland Government Nature Conservation Act 1992.

References 

lockyeri
Trees of Australia
Myrtales of Australia
Plants described in 1991
Flora of Queensland